The 2008 Puerto Rican general elections were held on Tuesday, November 4, 2008 to elect the officials of the Government of Puerto Rico that would serve for the next four years, most notably the Governor of Puerto Rico.

The election was won by incumbent Resident Commissioner of Puerto Rico Luis Fortuño (from the New Progressive Party), who defeated the incumbent Governor, Aníbal Acevedo Vilá (from the Popular Democratic Party). Fortuño received  1,025,965 votes, and Acevedo Vilá 801,071. Also, most of the other positions were won by the candidates of the New Progressive Party, who ended up with a majority of seats in the Senate and the House of Representatives.

The elections occurred after one term of what was called "shared government", as a result of the 2004 elections. Because of this, the island had a Governor from one party (Acevedo Vilá), while the opposing party held a majority in the Senate and the House of Representatives. The struggles faced by the opposing parties attempts at cooperation, mixed with the global economic crisis, paved the campaign for this elections. Also, Acevedo Vilá was facing criminal accusations at the time.

Fortuño was sworn in as Governor of Puerto Rico on January 2, 2009.

Significance
The 2008 Puerto Rican election was historic because:
 It was the first time in more than 20 years that a new party (PPR) joined the three traditional parties in the election.
 It was the first time in Puerto Rican political history that one of the candidates (Aníbal Acevedo Vilá) faced federal criminal charges.
 Supporters of former Governor Pedro Rosselló organized to promote a write-in campaign on his behalf after he lost the party primary against Luis Fortuño.

Nominations

Before the election year, the Constitution of Puerto Rico provides for any qualified person to present their candidacy for a specific position. If two or more candidates from the same party present their candidacy for the same position, and they can't reach an agreement within the party, a primary election is held. This election is held within the inscribed members of each party, to select which of the candidates will represent the party in the general election.

Both of the main parties: New Progressive Party (PNP) and Popular Democratic Party (PPD), held primaries for several positions on March 9, 2008. The PNP primary was more notable for having two candidates for the position of Governor of Puerto Rico.

New Progressive Party (PNP)

The primaries were held on March 9, 2008. In it, Fortuño comfortably defeated Rosselló to win the spot for Governor at the 2008 elections. Also, Pedro Pierluisi defeated Charlie Rodríguez and Miriam Ramírez de Ferrer with 60% of the votes to win the spot for Resident Commissioner.

Popular Democratic Party (PPD)

The primaries were held on March 9, 2008 to determine several candidates for the Senate, House of Representatives, and others. Among the most notable outcomes, former Secretary of Consumer Affairs Alejandro García Padilla received the most votes for the Senate, despite being his first time in an election.

Also, in the primaries for Mayor of Ponce, incumbent Francisco Zayas Seijo narrowly beat Carlos Jirau Vélez, for less than 50 votes.

Final candidates

Governor

After the primaries, the official candidates for Governor of Puerto Rico were set. The incumbent governor, Aníbal Acevedo Vilá, Popular Democratic Party (PPD) faced the following candidates for the Governorship:
 Luis Fortuño, Resident Commissioner of Puerto Rico, New Progressive Party (PNP)
 Edwin Irizarry Mora, Puerto Rican Independence Party (PIP)
 Rogelio Figueroa, Puerto Ricans for Puerto Rico Party (PPPR)

Resident Commissioner

The United States House of Representatives elections in Puerto Rico, 2008 was won by Pedro Pierluisi, New Progressive Party (PNP).  He ran against:
 Jessica Martínez Birriel, Puerto Rican Independence Party (PIP)
 Alfredo Salazar, Popular Democratic Party (PPD)
 Carlos Alberto Velazquez Lopez, Puerto Ricans for Puerto Rico Party (PPR)

Election results

Governor

Resident Commissioner

Senate of Puerto Rico

Puerto Rico House of Representatives

Mayoral

References
 "2008 General Elections Results". State Commission of Elections of Puerto Rico . San Juan, Puerto Rico. November 4, 2008.

External links
 Washington Post: Puerto Rican Governor Plans to Seek Reelection
 UPI: Puerto Rico approves Acevedo candidacy
 New York Daily News: Luis Fortuño wins pro-statehood primary in Puerto Rico  

Puerto Rico